Thermutis is a genus of fungi within the family Lichinaceae. It contains two species: Thermutis compacta and Thermutis velutina.

References

External links 
 Thermutis at Index Fungorum

Lichinomycetes
Lichen genera
Taxa named by Elias Magnus Fries
Taxa described in 1825